The 2007–08 Israeli Noar Leumit League was the fourteenth season since its introduction in 1994. It is the top-tier football in Israel for teenagers between the ages 18–20.

Beitar Jerusalem won the title, whilst Hapoel Nazareth Illit and Hapoel Ashkelon were relegated and were replaced by Hapoel Kfar Saba and Hapoel Petah Tikva who were promoted from Ligat Noar Artzit.

Final table

References

External links
Israel Football Association

 

Israeli Noar Premier League seasons
Yo